Chris Brown (born March 10, 1977 in Portland, Oregon) is an American soccer midfielder and forward who last played for Portland Timbers of USL-1.

Youth
Brown is an alumnus of Jesuit High School in Portland Oregon where he played soccer under the guidance of Dave Nicholas, varsity coach for the Crusaders. Brown played college soccer at the University of Portland from 1995 to 1998, scoring a total of 33 goals in his four years there, and being awarded for the MAC Award as a senior.

Professional
On February 2, 1999, Brown was selected fifth overall in the 1999 MLS College Draft by the Kansas City Wizards.  He immediately earned a spot in the Wizards rotation as a rookie, playing in 28 games and starting 19, while scoring four goals and making three assists.  He saw reduced playing time in 2000 after the Wizards' acquisition of Miklos Molnar, appearing in 22 games but only registering one assist; he did, however, make four appearances, two of them starts, assisting Kansas City in winning their first MLS Cup.  Brown regained his starting spot in 2001, and would fluctuate between being a starter and a valuable substitute for Kansas City for the next three years.

However, during the 2003 season, the Wizards traded Brown along with Darío Fabbro to the New England Revolution in exchange for Wolde Harris and Jorge Vazquez.  In his first start there, Brown's explosive scoring yielded him a hat-trick. However, he was traded again during the 2003 off-season to the San Jose Earthquakes the then reigning MLS champions, making it difficult for Brown to displace veteran team members and capture a starting position. In San Jose, he finished the season with two goals and one assist in eleven appearances. When the MLS announced two expansion teams, Brown was recruited by John Ellinger inaugural coach of Real Salt Lake to come and play for him there where he has remained a versatile and consistent starter. He was waived at the end of 2007 and signed for USL-1 side Portland Timbers in January, 2008.  In January 2009, Brown announced his retirement from playing professional soccer.

References

External links
 

Living people
1977 births
American soccer players
Association football midfielders
Association football forwards
Major League Soccer players
New England Revolution players
Portland Pilots men's soccer players
Portland Timbers (2001–2010) players
Real Salt Lake players
San Jose Earthquakes players
Soccer players from Portland, Oregon
Sporting Kansas City players
University of Portland alumni
USL First Division players
Sporting Kansas City draft picks